Mount Carmel School or Mount Carmel Green Lawns School is a private school in Darjeeling, India. It has an ICSE-based curriculum with English as the language of instruction. The school is one of the best upcoming and emerging schools in North Bengal. It has also attracted many students from Bhutan and Nepal. The school has created new talented young professionals every year and has narrowed the gap between the teachers and students and enables that ideas flow from both sides.

History
Mount Carmel School was established in 1982 by Mr Y.D Tshering, President School Managing Committee, Darjeeling and Mrs. K. Tshering, Director Mount Carmel School. Mr. and Mrs. Tshering played a key role in establishing the school. The school catered to the need of the local children and served as a primary school from 1982 to 2006 and a preparatory school from 2007 to 2016 but was upgraded to the secondary level in 2017 under the CICSE Board (Green Lawns School).

School Song
*Mount Carmel Signifies Challenge

We are ready to face it

As we know God is on our Side*

When we find ourselves in trouble,

We will overcome it,

As we know his presence will get us through

REPEAT CHORUS *

As we quest for knowledge

We believe his grace will sustain us

We believe in the truth, we believe in his word,

For the FEAR OF THE LORD IS THE BEGINNING OF WISDOM 

So Let Wisdom Prevail

REPEAT CHORUS*

Go Up higher and higher "Mount Carmel"

Higher and Higher "Mount Carmel"

Beyond academics

Management courses
The Management course is intended to prepare candidates for different vocations like Airlines, Fashion Designing, Hospitality etc., It is conducted for the classes 8 and above every week.

Weekly curricular classes
Every Fridays/Saturdays two periods are given for extra curricular activities and clubs.

Notable alumni 
 Dibya Chettri, actress
 Sadhna Singh, Singer

Location 
https://www.google.co.in/maps/place/Mount+Carmel+School/@27.0339506,88.2553102,15z/data=!4m5!3m4!1s0x0:0x7ed4404ec511898c!8m2!3d27.0339506!4d88.2553102

Reference 
www.mountcarmelschooldarjeeling.weebly.com

External links
 

Schools in Darjeeling district
Education in Darjeeling
Educational institutions established in 1982
1982 establishments in West Bengal